George Cleaveland Higgins (November 19, 1845 – August 15, 1933) was a Massachusetts politician who served as a Lynn, Massachusetts,  city councilor, a member of the Massachusetts House of Representatives and as the 22nd Mayor of Lynn, Massachusetts.

Higgins was born in Orleans, Massachusetts on November 19, 1845.  In 1862 Higgins moved to Lynn, Massachusetts. He died in 1933.

Notes

Mayors of Lynn, Massachusetts
Massachusetts city council members
Republican Party members of the Massachusetts House of Representatives
1845 births
1933 deaths